Hayhurst is a surname. Notable people with the surname include:

Albert Hayhurst (1905–1991), English cricketer and footballer
Andy Hayhurst (born 1962), former English cricketer
Dirk Hayhurst (born 1981), Major League Baseball pitcher and author
Edan Hayhurst, English actor
France-Hayhurst family lived in Bostock Hall near to Middlewich in Cheshire, England from 1775
George Adrian Hayhurst Cadbury (1929–2015), English businessman, chairman of Cadbury and Cadbury Schweppes for 24 years
Joseph Hayhurst (1864–1919), British politician and trade union leader
Pat Hayhurst, American politician
Stan Hayhurst (1925–1998), English professional footballer
Susan Hayhurst (1820–1909), American physician, pharmacist, and educator
Terry Hayhurst, top ranked Professional Canadian Dart Player
Will Hayhurst (born 1994), professional footballer
William Hayhurst (born 1887), farmer, principal, teacher, businessman and a Canadian federal politician

See also

Hayhurst, Portland, Oregon, neighborhood in the Southwest section of Portland, Oregon, USA
Hayhurst Building or Harlow Block, historic building located in Portland, Oregon, USA, built in 1882
Hayhurst Farm, historic farmhouse near Wrightstown, Pennsylvania built by Quaker minister John Hayhurst in 1742
Hayhurstia
Hurst (disambiguation)